Fantasy Stakes is a thoroughbred horse race held at Oaklawn Park, in Hot Springs, Arkansas, U.S.

Fantasy Stakes may also refer to:
Fantasy Stakes (Japan), held at Kyoto Racecourse, Kyoto, Japan
Fantasy Stakes (Canada), held at Hastings Racecourse, Vancouver, Canada